Kim Sơn may refer to several places in Vietnam, including:

Kim Sơn District, a rural district of Ninh Bình Province
Kim Sơn, Quảng Ninh, a ward of Đông Triều
Kim Sơn, Nghệ An, a township and capital of Quế Phong District
Kim Sơn, Sơn Tây, a commune of Sơn Tây, Hanoi
Kim Sơn, Gia Lâm, a commune of Gia Lâm District in Hanoi
Kim Sơn, Bắc Giang, a commune of Lục Ngạn District
Kim Sơn, Hòa Bình, a commune of Kim Bôi District
Kim Sơn, Lào Cai, a commune of Bảo Yên District
Kim Sơn, Thái Nguyên, a commune of Định Hóa District
Kim Sơn, Tiền Giang, a commune of Châu Thành District, Tiền Giang
Kim Sơn, Trà Vinh, a commune of Trà Cú District